Frederick is an unincorporated community in Upper Frederick Township in Montgomery County, Pennsylvania, United States. Frederick is located at the intersection of Pennsylvania Route 73 and Colonial Road.

References

Unincorporated communities in Montgomery County, Pennsylvania
Unincorporated communities in Pennsylvania